Aston is a small village in Wem Rural civil parish, Shropshire, England, near the River Roden. Aston contains a Grade II listed cottage.

See also
Listed buildings in Wem Rural

References

External links

Villages in Shropshire